Elizabeth A. Holm is a materials scientist at Carnegie Mellon University, working on computational materials. She worked at Sandia National Laboratories for 20 years before joining the faculty of Carnegie Mellon in 2012. She is a Fellow of The Minerals, Metals & Materials Society and Fellow of ASM International. She was the 2013 President of the society. She is internationally known for her theory and modeling work on microstructural response, interfaces, carbon nanotubes, and additive manufacturing.

Education 
Holm received her Bachelor of Science in Engineering degree in Materials Science and Engineering from the University of Michigan in 1987. She moved to Massachusetts Institute of Technology for a Master of Science in Ceramics in 1989, before returning to the University of Michigan dual Ph.D.s  in materials science and engineering and scientific computing in 1992.

Research and career 
Holm performs research on microstructural evolution in complex polycrystals employing computational materials science tools. She has bridged length scales from molecular dynamics at the atomic scale to Monte Carlo and phase field methods at the mesoscale to finite element at the continuum scale. Her research areas include theory and modeling of microstructural evolution in complex polycrystals, physical and mechanical response of microstructures, and machine learning to predict rare events. She makes novel use of machine vision and machine learning.

Awards and recognition 

 2002 Fellow of ASM International
2013 President of The Minerals, Metals & Materials Society
2019 Fellow of The Minerals, Metals & Materials Society
 2020 The Minerals, Metals & Materials Society Alexander Scott Distinguished Service Award

References 

American materials scientists
Women materials scientists and engineers
Living people
Year of birth missing (living people)
Fellows of the Minerals, Metals & Materials Society
University of Michigan College of Engineering alumni
20th-century American scientists
20th-century American women scientists
21st-century American scientists
21st-century American women scientists
21st-century American academics